H. robusta  may refer to:
 Harpa robusta, a sea snail species
 Hydrangea robusta, a plant species native to China and the Himalayas

See also
 Robusta (disambiguation)